Tooni Mahto is a  marine biologist, oceanographer and campaigner  known for co-presenting the BBC series Oceans and Britain's Secret Seas.

Career
Tooni Mahto graduated from Plymouth University and has worked in television as camera operator and researcher at the BBC's Natural History Unit. She works for the Australian Marine Conservation Society (AMCS) as a Marine Campaigns Officer.

References

External links
 Oceans on BBC
 Britain's Secret Seas on BBC
 

Living people
British marine biologists
Year of birth missing (living people)
Alumni of the University of Plymouth